Nicolás Fernando Núñez Gangas (born 28 September 1987) is a Chilean lawyer who was elected as a constituent of the Chilean Constitutional Convention for District 16 and is a member of the Social Green Regionalist Federation (FREVS). Prior to his election he attended and graduated from the University of Talca in Chile.

References

External links
 Profile at Chile Constituyente

Living people
1987 births
21st-century Chilean politicians
University of Talca alumni
Members of the Chilean Constitutional Convention
21st-century Chilean lawyers
Social Green Regionalist Federation politicians